Hiša na meji is a novel by Slovenian author Lucijan Vuga. It was first published in 2003.

See also
List of Slovenian novels

Slovenian novels
2003 novels